Howchin Glacier is a glacier between Ward Glacier and Walcott Glacier, on the east side of the Royal Society Range in Victoria Land, Antarctica. Brandau Crater is an ice-free volcanic crater lying to the south of the snout of Howchin Glacier on Chancellor Ridge, Royal Society Range It was discovered by a party led by Thomas Griffith Taylor of the British Antarctic Expedition, 1910–13, and named for Professor W. Howchin, a geologist of Adelaide.

References

Glaciers of Victoria Land
Scott Coast